Jumyr-Kylysh is the debut (and thus far, only) studio release from the all-instrumental Turkic/Kazakh folk/pagan metal band Ulytau, which hails from the Ulytau District in Kazakhstan. The album features modern, metal-based interpretations and arrangements of pieces by composers such as Vivaldi, Bach and Mozart, but keeps the emphasis on the Kazakh folk tradition; to that end, there are also arrangements of pieces from composers such as Makhambet Utemisov and Qurmangazy Sagyrbaiuly.

Track Listing
"Adai" (Qurmangazy Sagyrbaiuly) 3:12
"Winter (Four Seasons)"  (Vivaldi) 3:56
"Kurishiler" (I. Iskakov) 3:29
"Jumyr-Kylysh" (Makhambet Utemisov) 5:04
"Toccata and Fugue" (Bach) 4:15
"Ata Tolaguy" (Nurgisa Tilendiev) 4:11
"Turkish March" (Mozart) 4:11
"Yapyr-Ai" (Kazakh traditional folk song) 3:49
"Teriskapai" (Shalmyrza) 4:03
"Kokil" (Kazangap Tlepbergenovich) 3:36
Note: The liner notes contain a/an "Project Author"; this person goes by the name of Kydyrali Bolmanod.

Personnel
Maxim Kilchigin: Electric Guitar
Erjan Alimbetov: Dombra
Roman Adonin: Keyboards
Evgeny Sizov: Bass
Nurgaisha Sadvakasova: Violin
Igor Djavad-Zade: Drums

Production
Arranged and Directed by Tabriz Shakhidi
Produced by Tim Palmer and Maxim Kilchigin
Recorded by Slava Motliev at Vladimir Osinsky Studios
Mixed by Tim Palmer at Paramount Recording Studios
Mastered by Leonid Vorobiev at Vladimir Osinsky Studios

References

2006 debut albums